is a Japanese judoka.
 
He began judo at the age of 5.

He is Coached by former world champion and olympic silver medalist Shinichi Shinohara. He won the All-Japan Championships and took the bronze medal 
at the World Championships in 2009. His greatest achievement to date is winning the 2010 World Champions in Tokyo.

In September 2012, he defeated 10 judo black belts in a row during the 50th anniversary of LA Tenri Judo Club, defeating 8-time US judo champion Tokuzo Takahashi in his final match.

Anai's main tournament throws are Harai Goshi, Uchi Mata and O soto gari.

References

External links
 

Japanese male judoka
1984 births
Living people
Asian Games medalists in judo
World judo champions
Judoka at the 2012 Summer Olympics
Olympic judoka of Japan
Judoka at the 2010 Asian Games
Asian Games silver medalists for Japan
Medalists at the 2010 Asian Games
Universiade medalists in judo
Universiade gold medalists for Japan
Medalists at the 2007 Summer Universiade
21st-century Japanese people